Jan Błoński (15 January 1931 – 10 February 2009) was a Polish historian, literary critic, publicist and translator. He was a leading representative of the Kraków school of literary criticism, which wielded significant influence in postwar Poland.

Professor of the Jagiellonian University, Błoński was habilitated there for the work entitled Mikołaj Sęp Szarzyński and the beginnings of the Polish Baroque. He was the literary editor for the publication of Witold Gombrowicz's collected works in 1986–88 through Wydawnictwo Literackie. He was also the Fellow of Collegium Invisibile. In 1996–2001 he served as juror for the Nike Literary Award. In November 1995 he was awarded the Kraków Book of the Month Award for the collected works of Sławomir Mrożek, his long-time friend from the Stalinist period.

Biography
Jan Błoński was born in Warsaw in 1931. During the occupation of Poland by Nazi Germany, Błoński witnessed the liquidation of the Warsaw Ghetto in 1942; a Jewish boy who had escaped ran into him on the street, but he didn't help. This episode of passive complicity will breed a deep sense of guilt for years and inspire "Biedni Polacy patrzą na getto" (the Poor Poles look at the Ghetto; 1987), which remains among his most renowned publications. Błoński finished his studies in Polonistics at the Jagiellonian University in 1952 during the Stalinist era in Poland.

Błoński obtained a position with the Institute of Literary Studies of the Polish Academy of Sciences in 1959–62 (after the Polish October). From 1970 he was employed at the Jagiellonian University. He was a vice-rector for didactic affairs (1981–84), director of the Institute of Polish Studies (1988–91), director of the Department of the Theatre (1977–1980) and the Department of the 20th Century Polish Literature (1995–97). As professor, he also lectured Polish literature at the University of Sorbonne, the University of Clermont-Ferrand and the Paris University IV. He died on 10 February 2009 in Kraków.

References

External links
Holocaust scholar Jan Blonski dies, JTA, February 12, 2009
Pożegnanie Jana Błońskiego (Goodbye to Jan Błoński - series of articles) 
Jan Błoński,  with links to subsequent pages. 

1931 births
2009 deaths
Academic staff of Jagiellonian University
Polish literary critics
20th-century Polish historians
Polish male non-fiction writers
Fellows of Collegium Invisibile
Recipients of the Gold Medal for Merit to Culture – Gloria Artis